The following is a list of all team-to-team transactions that have occurred in the National Hockey League during the 1975–76 NHL season. It lists what team each player has been traded to, signed by, or claimed by, and for which player(s) or draft pick(s), if applicable.

Trades between teams

June

July

August

September

October

November

December 

  Trade completed on September 1, 1976.

January

February

March 

  Trade completed on June 14, 1977 at the 1977 NHL Amateur Draft.
  Trade completed on June 16, 1976.

Additional sources
 hockeydb.com - search for player and select "show trades"
 

Transactions
National Hockey League transactions